101st Battalion may refer to:

 101 Battalion (Libya), a military insurgent unit
 101 Battalion (South Africa), a unit of the South West Africa Territorial Force
 101st Battalion (Winnipeg Light Infantry), CEF, a unit of the Canadian Expeditionary Force
 101st Engineer Battalion, a unit of the United States Army
 101st Signal Battalion, a unit of the United States Army
 Reserve Police Battalion 101, a Nazi German paramilitary formation of Ordnungspolizei

See also
 101st Division (disambiguation)
 101st Brigade (disambiguation)
 101st Regiment (disambiguation)
 101 Squadron (disambiguation)